Spilia is a small village in the Nicosia District of Cyprus, located near Kyperounta. The hamlet of Kourdali is part of it.

References

Communities in Nicosia District